The 2020 CECAFA U17 Championship was the 4th CECAFA U-17 Championship organized by CECAFA (Council of East and Central Africa Football Association). It took place from 12 to 22 December 2020 in Gisenyi, Rwanda.

This competition also served as the CECAFA qualifiers for the 2021 Africa U-17 Cup of Nations as the two finalists of the tournament represented CECAFA in the CAF U-17 continental competition.

The 6 participating teams were drawn into 2 groups. The winners and the runners-up of each group advanced to the semi-finals.

Venue

Umuganda Stadium, Gisenyi - Rubavu

Teams

 - Disqualified 

 
 - Withdrew 
 - Withdrew 
 - Withdrew

Match officials

Referees
 Djaffari Nduwimana (Burundi) 
 Emmanuel Mwandembwa (Tanzania)
 Sabri Mohamed Fadul (Sudan)
 Tewodros Mitiku (Ethiopia)
 Mohamed Diraneh (Djibouti)
 Omar Abdulkadir Artan (Somalia)
 Israël Mpaima (Kenya)
 Sammuel Uwikunda (Rwanda) (Rwanda)
 (Ms) Shamirah Nabadda (Uganda)
 Ronald Madanda (Uganda)            

Assistant Referees
 Emery Niyongabo (Burundi)  
 Dieudonne Mutuyimana (Rwanda)
 Abd Elgabar Mohammed (Sudan)
 Gasim Madir Dehiya (South Sudan)
 Ahmad Abdulahi Farah (Somalia)
 Fasika Yehualashet (Ethiopia)
 Samuel Kuria (Kenya)
 (Ms) Carolyne Kiles (Kenya)
 Frank Komba (Tanzania) 
 Hakim Mulindwa (Uganda) 
 (Ms) Lydia Nantabo (Uganda)

Group stage

Group A
<onlyinclude>

Group B
<onlyinclude>

Knockout stage

In the knockout stages, if a match is level at the end of normal playing time, extra time is played (two periods of 15 minutes each) and followed, if necessary, by a penalty shoot-out to determine the winners.

Semi-finals
Winners qualified for 2021 Africa U-20 Cup of Nations.

3rd Place match

Final

Champion

Qualification for CAF U17 Cup of Nations
The two finalists of the tournament qualified for the 2021 Africa U-17 Cup of Nations. 

Qualified nations:

References

CECAFA competitions
2020 in African football